Bruce L. Hunter (born June 22, 1955) is the Iowa State Representative from the 34th District. He has served in the Iowa House of Representatives since 2003, when he was elected in a January special election to replace Frank Chiodo, who resigned before term start to become the legislative liaison for the Iowa Department for Economic Development.  Hunter was born in Alma, Wisconsin, was raised in Wisconsin and Minnesota, and resides in Des Moines, Iowa.  He attended Saint Cloud State University and Winona State University.

, Hunter serves on several committees in the Iowa House – the Human Resources and State Government committees.  He also serves as the ranking member of the Labor committee and as a member of the Administration and Regulation Appropriations Subcommittee.

Electoral history
*incumbent

References

External links

 Representative Bruce Hunter official Iowa General Assembly site
 
 Financial information (state office) at the National Institute for Money in State Politics

1955 births
Living people
Politicians from Des Moines, Iowa
People from Alma, Wisconsin
Minnesota Democrats
Iowa Democrats
Members of the Iowa House of Representatives
St. Cloud State University alumni
Winona State University alumni
21st-century American politicians